The Old People's Home (also known as The Home Association) is a historic building in the V.M. Ybor neighborhood of Tampa, Florida. It is located at 1203 East 22nd Avenue. On October 17, 2000, it was added to the U.S. National Register of Historic Places.

Built in 1924, the two story, Colonial Revival style building with a grand, columned  portico along the main facade was primarily designed by Frank A. Winn, Jr. and A.H. Johnson. It was Tampa's first privately supported and purpose-built home for the care of the elderly and represented a major civic achievement for the community.  The building is set on a  site which features several stately oak trees.

The building continues to operate as a residential elder-care facility per its original intent as The Home Association, Inc., a not-for-profit Senior Skilled Nursing Facility.

References

External links
 Hillsborough County listings at National Register of Historic Places
 Hillsborough County listings at Florida's Office of Cultural and Historical Programs
 The Old People's Home on Wikimapia

Buildings and structures in Tampa, Florida
National Register of Historic Places in Tampa, Florida
Colonial Revival architecture in Florida
Residential buildings completed in 1924
Nursing homes in the United States
1924 establishments in Florida